The Hawaii Technology Development Corporation (HTDC) is a state agency created in 1983 to foster the development of Hawaii's technology industry.

Naming 
The HTDC was established as the High Technology Development Corporation in 1983, but renamed in 2017 to more accurately describe its mission.

Responsibilities 
The HTDC is in charge of Hawaii's Small Business Innovation and Research (SIBR) grants which provides funding to develop new technology that was started in 1988.

History 
In May 2019, the HTDC partnered with BoxJelly to build the Entrepreneurs Sandbox, a co-working and entrepreneurship hub in Honolulu.

In January 2019, Len Higashi was named acting director after Robbie Melton stepped down from her almost five-year tenure as director and CEO.

In 2018, the HTDC lost ~$800,000 of income when the Manoa Innovation Center went back under control of University of Hawaii.

The Cyber Security and First Responder Tech Park 
In 2017, the HTDC faced criticism for its plans to build a 150-acre industrial park focused on first-responders called the Cyber Security and First Responder Tech Park. The plans for the park allocated the Hawaii Office of Enterprise Technology Services about 4 percent of the park's total built area and about 5 percent for the HTDC itself. The park, which is to be built near an NSA office, is the brainchild of Hawaii Sen. Donovan Dela Cruz.

References 

State agencies of Hawaii
1983 establishments in Hawaii